Kaspar Sjöberg (born 16 May 1987) is a Swedish football referee. He became a professional referee in 2008, has been an Allsvenskan referee since 2015 and a full international referee for FIFA since 2019. Sjöberg has refereed 96 matches in Allsvenskan, 42 matches in Superettan and 9 international matches as of 2019.

See also 

 List of football referees

References

External links 

 

1987 births
Living people
Swedish football referees